Trailer Park of Terror is a 2008 American horror film directed by Steven Goldmann and written by Timothy Dolan. It stars Nichole Hiltz, Matthew Del Negro, Trace Adkins, Myk Watford and Jeanette Brox.

Plot summary 

Based on the Imperium Comics series of the same name, Trailer Park of Terror follows six troubled high school students and their leader, the optimistic youth ministries pastor, Lewis (Matthew Del Negro). As the group return from an outdoor character building retreat in the mountains they become lost on the back roads after their bus crashes during a raging storm. The luckless group seeks refuge for the night in a seemingly abandoned trailer park down the road, managed by the strange and seductive Norma (Nichole Hiltz). As the night progresses they find that the park is anything but empty as Norma and her undead trailer trash buddies pick them off in imaginative ways.

Cast

Production

Release
Trailer Park of Terror first premiered at the Slamdance Film Festival in January 2008, and then later at the Toronto After Dark Film Festival on October 19, 2008.
The film was subsequently released on DVD on January 26, 2009.

Reception
Dai Green of Horrornews.net described the film as "a grotesque, bloody, hilarious, testament to what happens when a director knows there is more out there than horror-p*rn flicks,"  and likened the character of Norma to "a cross between Reese Witherspoon in ‘Freeway’ and Sherrie Moon Zombie in ‘House Of 1000 Corpses’."  He gave the film a rating of "four horns". Joe Leydon of Variety thought the film was well cast and that some of the young actors were impressive in their efforts to flesh out their thin roles.

See also 
House of 1000 Corpses
The Devil's Rejects
Wrong Turn

References

External links
 

2008 films
2008 horror films
American teen horror films
Summit Entertainment films
American zombie films
2000s English-language films
2000s American films